Kfardlakos,  Kfar Dlaqous, Kfardlaqous, is a village in Zgharta District, in the Northern Governorate of Lebanon.  Its population is predominantly Maronite Christians.

References

External links
 Kfar Dlaqous, Localiban
 Ehden Family Tree

Populated places in the North Governorate
Zgharta District
Maronite Christian communities in Lebanon